Jason Hernandez (born August 26, 1983) is the Manager for Player Engagement with Toronto FC. He has played for the Puerto Rico national team playing as a defender.

Hernandez played prep soccer at Paramus Catholic High School.

College
Hernandez played college soccer at Seton Hall University from 2001 to 2004, and captained the team in his final two seasons. He was also named Second Team ALL-BIG EAST in 2004.

Club career

MetroStars 
Hernandez was selected by the MetroStars with the sixth pick in the first round of the 2005 MLS Supplemental Draft and signed a developmental contract with the team for the 2005 season. After not playing a minute in the club's first 29 league games, he made his debut against Chicago on October 5, 2005. He started the last three games of the regular season, as well as both games in the playoffs.

Chivas USA 
Hernandez was traded to Chivas USA in a trade that allowed the MetroStars to move up to the first selection of the 2006 MLS SuperDraft and select Marvell Wynne.

In his initial campaign with Chivas, Hernandez went on to appear in 29 league matches, including 24 starts. During the 2007 season Hernandez saw his role reduced as he appeared in 21 league matches, starting only nine. He started three of the club's four playoff matches during his two-year stint at the Los Angeles-based club.

San Jose Earthquakes 
Hernandez was picked up by the San Jose Earthquakes in the 2007 MLS Expansion Draft. He made his debut on April 3, 2008, starting against LA Galaxy.

Hernandez would play for the club through the 2014 season, and would captain the team multiple times. His 160 games started and 13,859 minutes played placed him third all time in both categories for the club.

New York City 
Hernandez was selected by New York City FC as the 6th pick in the 2014 MLS Expansion Draft. He would start in their first ever MLS game, a 1–1 draw with Orlando City SC on March 8, 2015.

After the signing of Italian legend Andrea Pirlo in July 2015, Hernandez changed his number from 21 to 2 to honor his boyhood idol, New York Yankees legendary shortstop Derek Jeter. He was not retained following the 2016 season.

Toronto FC 
Hernandez was signed by Toronto FC in March 2017. He made his Toronto FC debut and his first start of the season on May 6, 2017, playing the full 90 minutes in a 1–0 win against the Seattle Sounders FC.

Hernandez was re-signed by Toronto FC on April 13, 2018,. He was released at the end of the 2018 season following the expiration of his contract.

Hernandez announced his retirement from professional football on April 2, 2019, and that he would be joining Toronto's front office as Manager of Player Engagement.

International career 
Hernandez was born in the United States to parents of Puerto Rican descent. In January 2009, he was called for a training camp with the United States, but he did not appear in a match for the team. Eligible for Puerto Rico through his parents, he made his international debut with the team in March 2016 during a Caribbean Cup qualifier against Guyana.

Career statistics

Honors

Club

San Jose Earthquakes
Supporters' Shield: 2012

Toronto FC
 MLS Cup: 2017
 Supporters' Shield: 2017
 Eastern Conference Winners (Playoffs): 2017
 Canadian Championship: 2017
 Trillium Cup: 2017

References

External links 

1983 births
Living people
American sportspeople of Puerto Rican descent
American soccer players
Association football defenders
Chivas USA players
New York City FC players
New York Red Bulls draft picks
New York Red Bulls players
Major League Soccer players
Paramus Catholic High School alumni
People from Englewood, New Jersey
Puerto Rican footballers
Puerto Rico international footballers
San Jose Earthquakes players
Seton Hall Pirates men's soccer players
Soccer players from New Jersey
Soccer players from New York (state)
Sportspeople from Bergen County, New Jersey
Toronto FC players
Toronto FC II players
USL Championship players